Antony and Cleopatra is a 1972 film adaptation of the play of the same name by William Shakespeare, directed by and starring Charlton Heston, and made by the Rank Organisation. Heston and Hildegarde Neil portray the titular roles of Mark Antony and Cleopatra, with a supporting cast featuring Eric Porter, John Castle, Fernando Rey, Carmen Sevilla, Freddie Jones, Peter Arne, Douglas Wilmer, Julian Glover and Roger Delgado. The picture was produced by Peter Snell from a screenplay by Federico De Urrutia and the director.

Cast
 Charlton Heston as Mark Antony
 Hildegarde Neil as Cleopatra
 Eric Porter as Enobarbus
 John Castle as Octavius Caesar 
 Fernando Rey as Lepidus
 Carmen Sevilla as Octavia
 Freddie Jones as Pompey
 Peter Arne as Menas
 Douglas Wilmer as Agrippa
 Roger Delgado as Soothsayer
 Julian Glover as Proculeius

Production
Distributors in 21 countries put up 65% of the $1.8 million budget (which was actually $2.7 million but Heston and Snell deferred their fees). A bank put up the remainder 35%. Heston asked Orson Welles to direct, but Welles turned it down, so he decided to do it himself.

The film was shot in Spain. Heston re-used leftover footage of the sea battle from his 1959 film Ben-Hur as well as outtakes from the 1963 "Cleopatra".

Charlton Heston had played Mark Antony in two previous Shakespearean films, both adaptations of Julius Caesar, the first in 1950, the second in 1970 (also produced by Peter Snell).

Home video
The film received poor reviews and, as a consequence, a very limited release in the United States. It was released on DVD in March 2011.

References

External links
 

Antony and Cleopatra
Swiss drama films
Films based on Antony and Cleopatra
British epic films
British historical drama films
1970s English-language films
English-language Spanish films
English-language Swiss films
Spanish epic films
1970s historical drama films
Films directed by Charlton Heston
Films scored by John Scott (composer)
Epic films based on actual events
Films shot in Almería
Historical epic films
1972 drama films
1972 directorial debut films
1970s British films